Vincent Berger (born 1 February 1967) is a French sailor. He competed in the Flying Dutchman event at the 1992 Summer Olympics.

References

External links
 

1967 births
Living people
French male sailors (sport)
Olympic sailors of France
Sailors at the 1992 Summer Olympics – Flying Dutchman
Sportspeople from Metz
20th-century French people